LaKeysia Rene Beene (born March 9, 1978) is an American former soccer goalkeeper who played for the United States women's national soccer team and the San Jose CyberRays of Women's United Soccer Association (WUSA).

Playing career

College
Beene attended and played college soccer as goalkeeper for the University of Notre Dame.  She graduated in 1999 having majored in environmental geoscience.  With the Fighting Irish, Beene was a two-time All-American and backstopped the team to a runners-up finish in the 1999 NCAA Division I Women's Soccer Championship.

Club
In 2000, Beene became one of the 24 founding players of the Women's United Soccer Association, (WUSA), the first official professional women's soccer league in the United States.  From 2001 to 2003, she played for the San Jose CyberRays. In 2001 Beene was named WUSA goalkeeper of the year, as the CyberRays won the championship game, beating Atlanta Beat on a penalty shootout.

Beene previously played for pro–am Women's Premier Soccer League (WPSL) team California Storm. She returned to the Storm when WUSA collapsed after the 2003 season.

International
Beene's first appearance on the United States women's national soccer team was on January 7, 2000, in an 8–1 win over Czech Republic in Melbourne, Australia.  She collected a total of 18 caps over the following three years, but was not included in the US squads for the 2000 Sydney Olympics, or the 2003 FIFA Women's World Cup.

International statistics

Personal life
Beene was a teenage Tang Soo Do champion. She graduated from the University of Notre Dame in January 2005 with a B.S. in environmental geosciences.

She was admitted to The State Bar of California in 2009 and currently practices environmental law in Sacramento.

References

External links
 
 Profile at Women's United Soccer Association
 Notre Dame player profile

Living people
1978 births
American women's soccer players
Notre Dame Fighting Irish women's soccer players
United States women's international soccer players
Women's United Soccer Association players
Soccer players from California
San Jose CyberRays players
Women's association football goalkeepers
California Storm players
Women's Premier Soccer League players
California lawyers
African-American women's soccer players
21st-century African-American sportspeople
21st-century African-American women
20th-century African-American sportspeople
20th-century African-American women
20th-century African-American people